Doshanlu (also Romanized as Doshan'lu) is a village in Yurchi-ye Gharbi Rural District of Kuraim District of Nir County, Ardabil province, Iran. At the 2006 census, its population was 69 in 22 households. The following census in 2011 counted 114 people in 30 households. The latest census in 2016 showed a population of 139 people in 50 households.

References 

Nir County

Towns and villages in Nir County

Populated places in Ardabil Province

Populated places in Nir County